Giorgio Venturini (1906–1984) was an Italian film producer. He also directed three films under the name Giorgio Rivalta.

Selected filmography
 William Tell (1949)
 Hand of Death (1949)
 Mistress of the Mountains (1950)
 Captain Demonio (1950)
 The Mistress of Treves (1952)
 Milady and the Musketeers (1952)
 Son of the Hunchback (1952)
 The Merchant of Venice (1953)
 Black Devils of Kali (1954)
 The Treasure of Bengal (1954)
 The Widow (1955)
 The Pharaohs' Woman (1960)
 The Avenger (1962)
 A Queen for Caesar (1962)
 The Sex of Angels (1968)
Director (as Giorgio Rivalta)
 The King's Prisoner (1954)
 The Cossacks (1960)
 The Pharaohs' Woman (1960)

References

Bibliography
 Bayman, Louis (ed.) Directory of World Cinema: Italy. Intellect Books, 2011.

External links

1906 births
1984 deaths
Italian film producers
Italian film directors